Arlen Aguayo-Stewart is a Canadian actress. She is most noted for her performance in the film Roads in February (Les routes en février), for which she won the Vancouver Film Critics Circle Award for Best Actress in a Canadian Film.

Roads in February was her first-ever starring role in a film. She previously had small supporting roles in film and television, and played the lead role in a stage production of Sarah Carlsen's play Unseamly. Alongside Deborah Drakeford, Carlos González-Vío, Ryan Hollyman, Andre Sills and Aviva Armour-Ostroff, she was a Dora Mavor Moore Award nominee for Outstanding Ensemble in 2019 for ARC Stage's production of Stef Smith's play Human Animals.

Filmography

Film

Television

Video Game

References

External links

Canadian film actresses
Canadian television actresses
Canadian stage actresses
Living people
Canadian people of Latin American descent
21st-century Canadian actresses
Year of birth missing (living people)